The 1974 Brussels summit was the second NATO summit bringing the leaders of member nations together at the same time.  The formal sessions and informal meetings in Brussels, Belgium took place on June 26, 1974.  This twenty-fifth anniversary event was only the third meeting of the NATO heads of state following the ceremonial signing of the North Atlantic Treaty on April 4, 1949.

The Summit took place 25 days before the Turkish invasion of Cyprus, the first war between 2 NATO Countries and parties.

Background
The organization faced a generational challenge; and the unresolved questions concerned whether  a new generation of leaders would be as committed to NATO as their predecessors had been.  The results of 1974 elections would change a significant number of officials at the top of allied governments—in the Britain, Prime Minister Edward Heath was replaced by the election of Harold Wilson; in France, President Georges Pompidou was replaced by Giscard d'Estaing; and in West Germany, Chancellor Willy Brandt was replaced by Helmut Schmidt.  The 1974 resignation of President Richard Nixon caused Gerald Ford to become the new head of the American government.

Agenda
The general discussions focused on the need to confirm the dedication of member countries of the Alliance to the aims and ideals of the Treaty in the 25th anniversary of its signature.  In addition, there were informal consultations on East-West relations in preparation for US-USSR summit talks on strategic nuclear arms limitations.

Accomplishments
NATO leaders signed of the Declaration on Atlantic Relations which had been adopted by NATO foreign ministers in meeting in Ottawa a week earlier.

See also
 EU summit
 G8 summit

Notes

References
 Thomas, Ian Q.R. (1997).  The promise of alliance: NATO and the political imagination. Lanham: Rowman & Littlefield. ;

External links
  NATO update, 1974

1974 Brussels summit
Diplomatic conferences in Belgium
20th-century diplomatic conferences
1974 in international relations
1974 in Belgium
1970s in Brussels
Belgium and NATO
June 1974 events in Europe
Events in Brussels